Zimbabwe Power Company Kariba F.C. is a Zimbabwean football club based in Kariba. They play in the top division of Zimbabwean football, the Zimbabwe Premier Soccer League.

On 8 May 2015, SAUL Chaminuka was sacked as manager of ZPC Kariba and his assistant manager Godfrey Tamirepi was sacked as well.

On 22 January 2015, The former Hardbody goalkeeper coach Tembo Chuma joined ZPC Kariba.

On 23 January 2019, ZPC Kariba have sacked assistant coach Mabelo Njekwa and manager Kennedy Nagoli ahead of the start of the new Premiership season. 

On 4 January 2019, Tamirepi new ZPC Kariba coach

Stadium
Currently the team plays at the Nyamhunga Stadium in Kariba.

References
Rodwell named new manager at ZPC Kariba

External links

facebook

Football clubs in Zimbabwe